The Autorité de Régulation des Communications Électroniques et de la Poste (ARCEP) is an independent agency in charge of regulating telecommunications and postal services in Benin.

External links

References 

Government  of Benin

Mass media regulation